Newcastle High School can refer to:

Newcastle High School (Nebraska) in Newcastle, Nebraska
Newcastle High School (Oklahoma) in Newcastle, Oklahoma
Newcastle High School (Texas) in Newcastle, Texas
Newcastle High School (Wyoming) in Newcastle, Wyoming
Newcastle High School (Australia) in Newcastle, New South Wales
Newcastle-under-Lyme School, a school in Newcastle-under-Lyme, England
Newcastle High School (KwaZulu-Natal) in Newcastle, KwaZulu-Natal, South Africa
Central Newcastle High School, an independent all-girls school in Newcastle upon Tyne

See also
New Castle High School (disambiguation)